Tom Carlin is the head men's soccer coach at Villanova University. He has coached the Wildcats since 2008, posting a 16-18-2 mark. His teams have made back-to-back Big East tournament appearances under his watch. He previously served as an assistant with the Wildcats in 1997. From 2000 to 2005, he was the head soccer coach at Arcadia University in Pennsylvania, where he posted a 99-23-3 record. He led that team to three Pennsylvania Athletic Conference titles and three NCAA championship appearances.

In 2006, he was associate head coach at Northwestern University for one year.

External links
Villanova bio

Villanova Wildcats men's soccer coaches
Living people
Arcadia University
Arcadia University alumni
Year of birth missing (living people)
American soccer coaches